Gojko Cimirot (born 19 December 1992) is a Bosnian professional footballer who plays as a defensive midfielder for Belgian Pro League club Standard Liège and the Bosnia and Herzegovina national team.

Cimirot started his professional career at Leotar, before joining Sarajevo in 2013. Two years later, he moved to PAOK. In 2018, he was transferred to Standard Liège.

A former youth international for Bosnia and Herzegovina, Cimirot made his senior international debut in 2014, earning over 30 caps since.

Club career

Early career
Cimirot came through youth academy of his hometown club Leotar, which he joined in 2000. He made his professional debut against Široki Brijeg on 1 May 2010 at the age of 17. On 28 April 2012, he scored his first professional goal in a triumph over Čelik Zenica.

Sarajevo
In June 2013, Cimirot signed a three-year deal with Sarajevo. On 28 July, he made his official debut for the side against Zrinjski Mostar. He won his first trophy with the club on 23 May 2014, when they secured the victory over Čelik Zenica in Bosnian Cup final.

PAOK
In August 2015, Cimirot was transferred to Greek outfit PAOK for an undisclosed fee. He made his competitive debut for the team on 23 August against Xanthi. On 21 February 2016, he scored his first goal for PAOK against Panathinaikos.

In November, he extended his contract until June 2019.

He won his first title with the club on 6 May 2017, by triumphing over AEK Athens in Greek Cup final.

Standard Liège
In January 2018, Cimirot moved to Belgian side Standard Liège on a deal until June 2023. On 28 January, he debuted officially for the team against Anderlecht. He won his first trophy with the club on 17 March, by beating Genk in Belgian Cup final. On 29 April, he scored his first goal for Standard Liège in a defeat of Gent.

Cimirot played his 100th game for the side against Waasland-Beveren on 17 August 2020.

International career
Cimirot was a member of Bosnia and Herzegovina under-21 team under coach Vlado Jagodić.

In August 2014, he received his first senior call-up, for a friendly game against Liechtenstein and a UEFA Euro 2016 qualifier against Cyprus. He debuted against the former on 4 September.

Career statistics

Club

International

Honours
Sarajevo
Bosnian Premier League: 2014–15
Bosnian Cup: 2013–14

PAOK
Greek Cup: 2016–17

Standard Liège
Belgian Cup: 2017–18

References

External links

1992 births
Living people
People from Trebinje
Serbs of Bosnia and Herzegovina
Bosnia and Herzegovina footballers
Bosnia and Herzegovina under-21 international footballers
Bosnia and Herzegovina international footballers
Bosnia and Herzegovina expatriate footballers
Association football midfielders
FK Leotar players
FK Sarajevo players
PAOK FC players
Standard Liège players
Premier League of Bosnia and Herzegovina players
Super League Greece players
Belgian Pro League players
Expatriate footballers in Greece
Expatriate footballers in Belgium
Bosnia and Herzegovina expatriate sportspeople in Greece
Bosnia and Herzegovina expatriate sportspeople in Belgium